Read Between the Lines is the only studio album by American rock band KSM. It was released on September 22, 2009 by Buena Vista and Walt Disney Records. The band toured with Demi Lovato to support the album. The album was produced and mostly written by Matthew Gerrard and Robbie Nevil. The album also includes a cover version of "I Want You to Want Me" by Cheap Trick, which was used to promote the new television series 10 Things I Hate About You on the ABC Family network.

Track listing

Reception

"Read Between the Lines," the title track and first single off the album, was named iTunes Single of the Week at the time of the album's release.  Billboard's album review refers to the band as a G-rated version of the Go-Go's but with the same "distinctive individual looks, spunky stage presence and monster riffs". The review calls Avril Lavigne the band's "closest cousin", but with more punk energy, and says that "the act's rock rings harder and truer than Miley Cyrus." Jason Thurston of AllMusic says "the five girls pull it off with panache, finishing the songs off with a 2000s teen pop gloss, or sometimes a '90s girl-ska-punk". Other reviews were not as favorable. While comparing the band's sound to No Doubt, lead singer Shelby Cobra's vocals are called "limited" and on the "worst squeaky side of Gwen Stefani."

Personnel
 Shelby Cobra – lead vocals
 Shae Padilla – lead guitar
 Katie Cecil – rhythm guitar, backing vocals (lead vocals on tracks 4,9)
 Sophia Melon – bass, backing vocals
 Kate Cabebe – drums

References

2009 debut albums
Walt Disney Records albums